The 1991 Menzies by-election was held in the Australian electorate of Menzies in Victoria on 11 May 1991. The by-election was triggered by the resignation of the sitting member, the former deputy Liberal Party leader Neil Brown.

The Australian Labor Party did not field a candidate. The by-election was won by the Liberal Party's Kevin Andrews.

Results

See also
 List of Australian federal by-elections

References

Menzies by-election
Victorian federal by-elections
Menzies by-election, 1991
Menzies by-election